Harry Sharuh Radhakishun (25 July 1921 – 3 January 1983) was a Surinamese businessman and politician. He served as Deputy Prime Minister of Suriname and Minister of Finance from 1969 to 1973, and as Minister of Agriculture, Livestock and Fisheries from 1963 to 1967.

Early life
Radhakishun was born in Paramaribo in 1921. He studied at the Hendrikschool (Mulo), and also attended law classes taught by Julius Caesar de Miranda.  He took part for a few years in the correspondence course for accountancy and commercial sciences offered by the La Salle Extension University in Chicago.

Publisher
Together with his wife Fanny and close friend Lou Lichtveld, Radhakishun established the publishing house "Radhakishun & Co." in Paramaribo in 1952.

Politics
Radhakishun was a founding member of the VHP.  He was a member of the Estates of Suriname (national legislature) from 1951 to 1963 and from 1967 to 1969.

Death
Radhakishun died in Amsterdam in January 1983 at the age of 61.

Honours
: Knight (Ridder), Order of the Netherlands Lion
: Officer (Officier), then Commander (Commandeur), Order of Orange-Nassau
: Grand Cross (Gran Cruz), Order of Vasco Núñez de Balboa (1965) 
: Grand Cross (Gran Cruz), Order of San Carlos (1967)

References

1921 births
1983 deaths
Commanders of the Order of Orange-Nassau
Finance ministers of Suriname
Knights of the Order of the Netherlands Lion
People from Paramaribo
Progressive Reform Party (Suriname) politicians
20th-century Surinamese businesspeople
Surinamese Hindus
Surinamese politicians of Indian descent